

This is a list of telecommunications encryption terms. This list is derived in part from the Glossary of Telecommunication Terms published as Federal Standard 1037C.

A5/1a stream cipher used to provide over-the-air communication privacy in the GSM cellular telephone standard.
Bulk encryption
Cellular Message Encryption Algorithma block cipher which was used for securing mobile phones in the United States.
Cipher
Cipher system
Cipher text
Ciphony
Civision
Codress message

COMSEC equipment

Cryptanalysis
Cryptographic key
CRYPTO (International Cryptology Conference)
Crypto phone
Crypto-shredding
Data Encryption Standard (DES) 
Decipher
Decode
Decrypt
DECT Standard Cipher
Descrambler
Dncipher
Encode
Encoding law
Encrypt
End-to-end encryption

group
IMSI-catcheran eavesdropping device used for interception of cellular phones and usually is undetectable for users of mobile phones.
Key distribution center (KDC)
Key management
Key stream
KSD-64
Link encryption
MISTY1
Multiplex link encryption
Net control station (NCS)
Null cipher
One-time pad
Over the Air Rekeying (OTAR)
Plaintext
PPPoX
Protected distribution system (PDS)
Protection interval (PI)
Pseudorandom number generator
Public-key cryptography
RED/BLACK concept
RED signal

Remote rekeying
Security management
Spoofing
Squirtto load or transfer code key from an electronic key storage device. See Over the Air Rekeying.
STU-IIIa family of secure telephones introduced in 1987 by the National Security Agency for use by the United States government, its contractors, and its allies.
Superencryption
Synchronous crypto-operation
Transmission security key (TSK)
Trunk encryption device (TED)
Type 1 encryption
Type 2 encryption
Type 3 encryption
Type 4 encryption
Unique key

VoIP VPNcombines voice over IP and virtual private network technologies to offer a method for delivering secure voice.
ZRTPa cryptographic key-agreement protocol used in  Voice over Internet Protocol (VoIP) phone telephony.

See also

Communications security
CONDOR secure cell phone
Cryptography standards
Secure communication
Secure telephone
 Telecommunications

References

Further reading
Rutenbeck, Jeff (2006). Tech terms: what every telecommunications and digital media person should know. Elsevier, Inc. 
Kissel, Richard (editor). (February, 2011). Glossary of Key Information Security Terms (NIST IR 7298 Revision 1). National Institute of Standards and Technology.

External links
 "Federal Standard 1037C."Telecommunications: Glossary of Telecommunication Terms
 Embedding Security into Handsets Would Boost Data Usage - Report (2005) from Cellular-news.com
Wireless, Telecom and Computer Glossary from Cellular Network Perspectives

Telecommunications encryption terms